Leung Mee Ping (born 1961) is a Hong Kong artist. Leung's research-based artistic practice integrates elements of theatre, design, and social space. Leung's works explore issues and themes related to visual culture, effects of globalisation, memory, and material culture.

Personal Life and Education 
Leung Mee Ping grew up in a broken family. While studying in primary school, she won a drawing competition. Since that time, she started to fall into drawing and calligraphy.

Leung moved out when she was very young after her parents separated. Despite this, she has always been close to her mother and sisters, who support her and are a main theme of Leung's artworks. After working in a bookstore for two years, Leung saved up and was admitted into École nationale supérieure des Beaux-Arts. In 1983, Leung Mee Ping left Hong Kong and began her art studies in Paris. There, she learned to paint in abstract and expressionist styles. Before she graduated from L’ École nationale supérieure des Beaux-Arts a Paris in 1991, she started exploring with alternative materials to create art. She began creating her work, "Elsewhere (1991-2014)", initiated by a close friend's passing, during this time. It is a mixed media installation consisting of thousands of tea bags sewn together. Made through the repetitive action of sewing teabags, Leung's work is meditative contemplation on being and death. She won the Premier prix Rocheron Award for this work in 1991. Apart from tea bags, various objects such as quail eggs, photos, tiles etc. began to be incorporated in Leung's mixed media art and installation works.

After returning to Hong Kong in 1994, she held her first solo exhibition "Mixed-Media Work by LEUNG MEE PING" in Fringe Club. Leung also worked as an art editor of the Hong Kong Economic Times (hket, a financial daily in Hong Kong). In early 1996, she became a founding member of Para Site, helping to set up the new artist-run space. In 1998, she emigrated to USA and obtained her MFA from California Institute of Arts in 2000.

Following her MFA, Leung obtained a Ph.D from Chinese University of Hong Kong (Religious & Cultural Studies Department). In 2018, she became a Professor at the Academy of Visual Arts, Hong Kong Baptist University.

Exhibitions 
Leung's works mainly focuses on the ethic, community and memories of the human living situation, They also examine daily life through the perception of daily life itself. Art genres include mixed-media, video, multi-media installation and site-specific event-based project.

Solo exhibitions

Group exhibitions

Awards

Notable Works

Elsewhere (1991–2002) 
Initiated by a close friend's passing, Leung began collecting tea bags to create Elsewhere in 1991. Elsewhere is mixed media installation consisting of thousands of tea bags sewn together. Made through the repetitive action of sewing teabags, Leung's work is meditative contemplation on being and death. In 1991, Leung won the Premier prix Rocheron Award for this work.

Memorise the Future (1998-2006) 
Memorise the Future (1998-2006), first shown at the Hong Kong Museum of Art, is an installation composed of 3,000 children shoes made of human hair (4 to 5 inches for each). Leung collected the hair from over 10,000 people, encompassing one hundred nations, various demographics, also symbolising disparate and diverse 'memories'. She then mixed, knit and wove the collected hair, blurring geographical boundaries and identities. The shoes themselves also carry meaning, pointing towards the future.

Out of place (2005-2011) 
Out of place (2005-2011) is a series of video installation which feature different places (including Hong Kong, Shenzhen, Taipei, Beijing, Shanghi, Ski Lanka and Macau). Leung followed a number of individuals wondering aimlessly through the streets of varying locales, attempting to discover new psychogeographical routes through the mapping of purposeless.

I Miss Fanta (2012) 
I Miss Fanta was presented as part of Mobile M+: Yau Ma Tei, a series of nomadic pre-opening exhibitions organised by M+. I Miss Fanta consists of three iconic outdoor neon signs of Coca-Cola, Fanta, and Sprite previously installed along Macau's main shopping artery Avenida de Almeida Ribeiro, where they were an integral and memorable part of the urban visual landscape. After Leung discovered that two of the signs, had recently been removed, she found and transplanted the signs in this work, re-lighting the neon in the process. She displayed them on the ground of the park in Yau Ma Tei, echoing how they were found on the platform in the Coca-Cola factory in Macau, and documented the move in videos shown in a nearby junk and recycling shop. Leung transforms all these visual symbols related to personal and collective memory into a sculptural installation, bringing the tension between heritage conservation and urban gentrification to the surface as well.

Star Pupas (2014) 
In 2014, Leung enrolled in ‘’Fleeting Light’’, a large scale media arts exhibition presented by The Hong Kong Arts Development Council. The exhibition was held outside Hong Kong Science Museum during 14 September to 28 September 2014.

For this exhibition, Leung designed a mobile app called ‘’Star Pupas’’ where visitors could scan images of stars in the sky, "name" said stars and leave messages for friends. The images and the messages were then projected onto a dome-shaped tent. The more stars that are shared, the more light there will be in the tent. Leung aimed to claim back starlight, which is often obscured by light pollution in urban cities, and also to invite visitors to 'look up' away from their smartphones, not only to the sky but also to the community around them.

Pearl River Delta Series I: Made in Hong Kong (2014) 
Leung Mee Ping’s Pearl River Delta Series I: Made in Hong Kong was a mixed-media installation investigating the relationships between cities in the Pearl River Delta—Hong Kong, Shenzhen and Macau. In particular, Leung was curious about the souvenir painting trade, which had recently moved from Hong Kong to Shenzhen. Leung herself went to Dafen to apprentice herself as a trainee to learn about the rapid painting production. She then commissioned a number of paintings of various Hong Kong scenes, which were created sometimes by herself or by other trainees. She signed each of the paintings, no matter who had created them. Leung questions ideas of origin, identity, gaze and ownership in this installation as viewers are invited to look on a set of souvenir paintings depicting mundane, everyday scenes in Hong Kong.

References

1961 births
Living people
Hong Kong artists
Hong Kong women artists